The Nuragic civilization, also known as the Nuragic culture, was a civilization or culture on Sardinia (Italy), the second largest island in the Mediterranean Sea, which lasted from the 18th century BC  (Middle Bronze Age) (or from the 23rd century BC ) up to the Roman colonization in 238 BC. Others date the culture as lasting at least until the 2nd century AD and in some areas, namely the Barbagia, to the 6th century AD or possibly even to the 11th century AD.

The adjective "Nuragic" is neither an autonym nor an ethnonym. It derives from the island's most characteristic monument, the nuraghe, a tower-fortress type of construction the ancient Sardinians built in large numbers starting from about 1800 BC. Today more than 7,000 nuraghes dot the Sardinian landscape.

No written records of this civilization have been discovered, apart from a few possible short epigraphic documents belonging to the last stages of the Nuragic civilization. The only written information there comes from classical literature of the Greeks and Romans, and may be considered more mythical than historical.

History

Pre-Nuragic Sardinia

In the Stone Age the island was first inhabited by people who had arrived there in the Paleolithic and Neolithic ages from Europe and the Mediterranean area. The most ancient settlements have been discovered both in central and northern Sardinia (Anglona). Several later cultures developed on the island, such as the Ozieri culture (3200−2700 BC). The economy was based on agriculture, animal husbandry, fishing, and trading with the mainland. With the diffusion of metallurgy, silver and copper objects and weapons also appeared on the island.

In 2014, early Chalcolithic period Sardinia was identified as one of the earliest silver extraction centres in the world. This took place during the 4th millennium BC.

Remains from this period include hundreds of menhirs (called perdas fittas)  and dolmens, more than 2,400 hypogeum tombs called domus de Janas, the statue menhirs, representing warriors or female figures, and the stepped pyramid of Monte d'Accoddi, near Sassari, which show some similarities with the monumental complex of Los Millares (Andalusia) and the later talaiots in the Balearic Islands. According to some scholars, the similarity between this structure and those found in Mesopotamia are due to cultural influxes coming from the Eastern Mediterranean.

The altar of Monte d'Accoddi fell out of use starting from c. 2000 BC, when the Beaker culture, which at the time was widespread in almost all western Europe, appeared on the island. The beakers arrived in Sardinia from two different regions: firstly from Spain and southern France, and secondly from Central Europe, through the Italian Peninsula.

Nuragic era

Early Bronze Age

The Bonnanaro culture was the last evolution of the Beaker culture in Sardinia (c. 1800–1600 BC), and displayed several similarities with the contemporary Polada culture of northern Italy. These two cultures shared common features in the material culture such as undecorated pottery with axe-shaped handles. These influences may have spread to Sardinia via Corsica, where they absorbed new architectural techniques (such as cyclopean masonry) that were already widespread on the island.

New peoples coming from the mainland arrived on the island at that time, bringing with them new religious philosophies, new technologies and new ways of life, making the previous ones obsolete or reinterpreting them.

The widespread diffusion of bronze brought numerous improvements. With the new alloy of copper and tin (or arsenic), a harder and more resistant metal was obtained, suitable for manufacturing tools used in agriculture, hunting and warfare.

At a later phase of this period (Bonnanaro A2)  probably dates the construction of the so-called proto-nuraghe, a platformlike structure that marks the first phase of the Nuragic Age. These buildings are very different from the classical nuraghe having an irregular planimetry and a very stocky appearance. They are more numerous in the central-western part of Sardinia, later they spread in the whole Island.

Middle and Late Bronze Age

Dating to the middle of the 2nd millennium BC, the nuraghe, which evolved from the previous proto-nuraghe, are megalithic towers with a truncated cone shape; every Nuragic tower had at least an inner tholos chamber and the biggest towers could have up to three superimposed tholos chambers. They are widespread in the whole of Sardinia, about one nuraghe every three square kilometers.

Early Greek historians and geographers speculated about the mysterious nuraghe and their builders. They described the presence of fabulous edifices, called daidaleia, from the name of Daedalus, who, after building his labyrinth in Crete, would have moved to Sicily and then to Sardinia.

Modern theories about their use have included social, military, religious, or astronomical roles, as furnaces, or as tombs. Although the question has long been contentious among scholars, the modern consensus is that they were built as defensible homesites, and that included barns and silos.

In the second half of the 2nd millennium BC, archaeological studies have proved the increasing size of the settlements built around some of these structures, which were often located at the summit of hills. Perhaps for protection reasons, new towers were added to the original ones, connected by walls provided with slits forming a complex nuraghe.

Among the most famous of the numerous existing nuraghe, are the Su Nuraxi at Barumini, Santu Antine at Torralba, Nuraghe Losa at Abbasanta, Nuraghe Palmavera at Alghero, Nuraghe Genna Maria at Villanovaforru, Nuraghe Seruci at Gonnesa and Arrubiu at Orroli. The biggest nuraghe, such as Nuraghe Arrubiu, could reach a height of about 25–30 meters and could be made up of 5 main towers, protected by multiple layers of walls, for a total of dozens of additional towers. It has been suggested that some of the current Sardinian villages trace their origin directly from Nuragic ones, including perhaps those containing the root Nur-/Nor- in their name (like Nurachi, Nuraminis, Nurri, Nurallao, Noragugume).

Soon Sardinia, a land rich in mines, notably copper and lead, saw the construction of numerous furnaces for the production of alloys which were traded across the Mediterranean basin.  Nuragic people became skilled metal workers; they were among the main metal producers in Europe  and produced a wide variety of bronze objects.  New weapons such as swords, daggers and axes preceded drills, pins, rings, bracelets, statuettes and the votive boats that show a close relationship with the sea. Tin may have drawn Bronze Age traders from the Aegean where copper is available but tin for bronze-making is scarce.  The first verifiable smelting slag has come to light, its appearance in a hoard of ancient tin confirms local smelting as well as casting.  The usually cited tin sources and trade in ancient times are those in the Iberian Peninsula or from Cornwall. Markets included civilizations living in regions with poor metal resources, such as the Mycenaean civilization, Cyprus and Crete, as well as the Iberian peninsula, a fact that can explain the cultural similarities between them and the Nuraghe civilization and the presence in Nuragic sites of late Bronze Age Mycenaean, west and central Cretan and Cypriote ceramics, as well as locally made replicas, concentrated in half a dozen findspots that seem to have functioned as "gateway-communities.

Sea Peoples connection

The late Bronze Age (14th–13th–12th centuries BC) saw a vast migration of the so-called Sea Peoples, described in ancient Egyptian sources. They destroyed Mycenaean and Hittite sites and also attacked Egypt. According to Giovanni Ugas, the Sherden, one of the most important tribes of the sea peoples, are to be identified with the Nuragic Sardinians. This identification has been also supported by Antonio Taramelli, Vere Gordon Childe, Sebastiano Tusa, Vassos Karageorghis and Carlos Roberto Zorea, from the Complutense University of Madrid. Another hypothesis is that they came to the island around the 13th or 12th century after the failed invasion of Egypt. However, these theories remain controversial.
Simonides of Ceos and Plutarch spoke of raids by Sardinians against the island of Crete, in the same period in which the Sea People invaded Egypt. This would at least confirm that Nuragic Sardinians frequented the eastern Mediterranean Sea.
Further proofs come from 13th-century Nuragic ceramics found at Tiryns, Kommos, Kokkinokremnos, Hala Sultan Tekke, and in Sicily, at Lipari, and the Agrigento area, along the sea route linking western to eastern Mediterranean.

The archaeologist Adam Zertal has proposed that the Harosheth Haggoyim of Israel, home of the biblical figure Sisera, is identifiable with the site of "El-Ahwat" and that it was a Nuragic site suggesting that he came from the people of the Sherden of Sardinia. Influences of the Nuragic architecture at El-Ahwat have been noticed also by Bar Shay, from Haifa University.

Iron Age
Archaeologists traditionally define the nuragic phase ranging from 900 BC to 500 BC (Iron Age) as the era of the aristocracies. Fine ceramics were produced along with more and more elaborate tools and the quality of weapons increased.

With the flourishing of trade, metallurgical products and other manufactured goods were exported to every corner of the Mediterranean, from the Near East to Spain and the Atlantic. The huts in the villages increased in number and there was generally a large increase in population. The construction of the nuraghes stopped (many were abandoned or partially dismantled starting from 1150 BC) and individual tombs replaced collective burials (Giant's Tombs).

But the real breakthrough of that period, according to archaeologist Giovanni Lilliu, was the political organization which revolved around the parliament of the village, composed by the heads and the most influential people, who gathered to discuss the most important issues.

Carthaginian and Roman conquest

Around 900 BC the Phoenicians began visiting Sardinia with increasing frequency. The most common ports of call were Caralis, Nora, Bithia, Sulci, Tharros, Bosa and Olbia.

The Roman historian Justin describes a Carthaginian expedition led by Malchus in 540 BC against a still strongly Nuragic Sardinia. The expedition failed and this caused a political revolution in Carthage, from which Mago emerged. He launched another expedition against the island, in 509 BC, after the Sardinians attacked the Phoenicians' coastal cities. According to Piero Bartoloni, it was Carthage that attacked the Phoenician cities in the coasts, rather than the natives who lived in those cities with the Phoenicians, for the Phoenician cities destroyed, such as Sulcis or Monte Sirai, he postulated as being inhabited mostly by native Sardinians. The Carthaginians, after a number of military campaigns in which Mago died and was replaced by his brother Hamilcar, overcame the Sardinians and conquered coastal Sardinia, the Iglesiente with its mines and the southern plains. The Nuragic culture may have survived in the mountainous interior of the island.

In 238 BC the Carthaginians, as a result of their defeat by the Romans in the first Punic War, surrendered Sardinia to Rome. Sardinia together with Corsica became a Roman province (Corsica et Sardinia), however the Greek geographer Strabo confirms the survival, in the interior of the island, of Nuragic culture even in Imperial times.

Society

Religion had a strong role in Nuragic society, which has led scholars to the hypothesis that the Nuragic civilization was a theocracy.

Some Nuraghe bronzes clearly portray the figures of chief-kings, recognizable by their wearing a cloak and carrying a staff with bosses. Also depicted are other classes, including miners, artisans, musicians, wrestlers (the latter similar to those of the Minoan civilizations) and many fighting men, which has led scholars to think of a warlike society, with precise military divisions (archers, infantrymen). Different uniforms could belong to different cantons or clans, or to different military units. The priestly role may have been fulfilled by women. Some small bronzes also give clues about Nuragic personal care and fashion. Women generally had long hair; men sported two long braids on each side of the face, while their head hair was cut very short or else covered by a leather cap.

Villages

The Nuragic civilization was probably based on clans, each led by a chief, who resided in the complex nuraghe, with common people living in the nearby villages of stone roundhouses with straw roofs, similar to the modern pinnettas of the Barbagia shepherds.

In the late final Bronze Age and in the Early Iron Age phases, the houses were built with a more complex plan, with multiple rooms often positioned around a courtyard; in the Nuragic settlement of Sant'Imbenia, located by the coast, some structures were not used for living purposes, but for the storing of precious metals, food and other goods and they were built around a huge square, interpreted by archaeologists as a marketplace.
The construction of rectangular houses and structures built with dried bricks is attested in some sites across the island since the late Bronze Age.

Water management was essential for the Nuragic people, most complex Nuraghi were provided with at least a well; Nuraghe Arrubiu, for example, presented a complex hydraulic implant for the drainage of water
Another testimony to the Nuragic prowess in the creation of hydraulic implants is the aqueduct of Gremanu, the only known Nuragic aqueduct yet.

During the final phase of the Bronze Age and the early Iron Age Sardinia saw the development of proto urban settlements, with open spaces such as paved squares and streets, and structures devoted to specific functions such as metal workshops, the individual houses were provided with storing facilities and were served by infrastructures.

Tribes

Throughout the second millennium and into the first part of the 1st millennium BC, Sardinia was inhabited by the single extensive and uniform cultural group represented by the Nuragic people.

Centuries later, Roman sources describe the island as inhabited by numerous tribes which had gradually merged culturally. They however maintained their political identities and the tribes often fought each other for control of the most valuable land. The most important Nuragic populations mentioned include the Balares, the Corsi and the Ilienses, the latter defying the Romanization process and living in what had been called Civitatas Barbarie (now Barbagia).

The Ilienses or Iolaes (later Diagesbes), identified by ancient writers as Greek colonists led by Iolaus (nephew of Heracles) or Trojan refugees, lived in what is now central-southern Sardinia. Greek historians reported also that they were repeatedly invaded by the Carthaginians and the Romans, but in vain.
The Balares have been identified with the Beaker culture. They lived in what are now the Nurra, Coghinas and Limbara traditional subdivisions of Sardinia. They were probably of the same stock from which the Talaiotic culture of the Balearic Islands originated.
The Corsi lived in Gallura and in Corsica. They have been identified as the descendants of the Arzachena culture. In southern Corsica, in the 2nd millennium BC, the Torrean civilization developed alongside the Nuragic one.

Culture

Religion
The representations of animals, such as the bull, belong most likely to pre-Nuragic civilizations, however they kept their importance among the Nuraghe people, and were frequently depicted on ships, bronze vases, used in religious rites. Small bronze sculptures depicting half-man, half-bull figures have been found, as well as characters with four arms and eyes and two-headed deer: they probably had a mythological and religious significance. Another holy animal which was frequently depicted is the dove. Also having a religious role were perhaps the small chiseled discs, with geometrical patterns, known as pintadera, although their function has not been identified yet.

A key element of the Nuragic religion was that of fertility, connected to the male power of the Bull-Sun and the female one of Water-Moon. According to the scholars' studies, there existed a Mediterranean-type Mother Goddess and a God-Father (Babai). An important role was that of mythological heroes such as Norax, Sardus, Iolaos and Aristeus, military leaders also considered to be divinities.

The excavations have indicated that the Nuragic people, in determinate periods of the year, gathered in common holy places, usually characterized by sitting steps and the presence of a holy pit. In some holy areas, such as Gremanu at Fonni, Serra Orrios at Dorgali and S'Arcu 'e Is Forros at Villagrande Strisaili, there were rectangular temples, with central holy room housing perhaps a holy fire. The deities worshipped are unknown, but were perhaps connected to water, or to astronomical entities (Sun, Moon, solstices).

Some structures could have a "federal" Sardinian role, such as the sanctuary of Santa Vittoria near Serri (one of the biggest Nuragic sanctuaries, spanning over 20 hectares), including both religious and civil buildings: here, according to Italian historian Giovanni Lilliu, the main clans of the central island held their assemblies to sign alliances, decide wars, or to stipulate commercial agreements. Spaces for trades were also present. At least twenty of such multirole structures are known, including those of Santa Cristina at Paulilatino and of Siligo; some have been re-used as Christian temples (such as the cumbessias of San Salvatore in Sinis at Cabras). Some ritual pools and bathtubs were built in the sanctuaries such as the pool of Nuraghe Nurdole, which worked through a system of raceways.

Holy wells

The holy wells were structures dedicated to the cult of waters. Though initially assigned to the 8th–6th centurie BC, due to their advanced building techniques, they most likely date to the earlier Bronze Age, when Sardinia had strong relationships with the Mycenaean kingdoms of Greece and Crete, around the 14–13th century BC.

The architecture of the Nuragic holy wells follows the same pattern as that of the nuraghe, the main part consisting of a circular room with a tholos vault with a hole at the summit. A monumental staircase connected the entrance to this subterranean (hypogeum) room, whose main role is to collect the water of the sacred spring. The exterior walls feature stone benches where offerings and religious objects were placed by the faithful. Some sites also had sacrificial altars. Some scholars think that these could be dedicated to Sardus, one of the main Nuragic divinities.

A sacred pit similar to those of Sardinia has been found in western Bulgaria, near the village of Garlo.

Roundhouses with basin
Starting from the late Bronze Age, a peculiar type of circular structure with a central basin and benches located all around the circumference of the room start to appear in Nuragic settlements, the best example of this type of structure is the ritual fountain of Sa Sedda e Sos Carros, near Oliena, where thanks to a hydraulic implant of lead pipes water was poured down from the ram shaped protomes inside the basin. Some archaeologists interpreted these buildings, with ritual and religious function, as thermal structures.

Megaron temples

Located in various parts of the Island and dedicated to the cult of the healthy waters, these unique buildings are an architectural manifestation that reflects the cultural vitality of the nuragic peoples and their interaction with the coeval mediterranean civilizations. In fact, many scholars see in these buildings foreign Aegean influences.

They have a rectilinear form with the side walls that extend outwardly. Some, like that of Malchittu at Arzachena, are apsidal while others such as the temple of Sa Carcaredda at Villagrande Strisaili culminate with a circular room. They are surrounded by sacred precincts called temenos.
Sometimes multiple temples are found in the same location, such as in the case of the huge sanctuary of S'Arcu e sos forros, where many megaron temples with a complex plant were excavated.
The largest and best preserved Sardinian Mégara is that called Domu de Orgia at Esterzili.

Giant's graves

The so-called "giant's graves" were collective funerary structures whose precise function is still unknown, and which perhaps evolved from elongated dolmens. They date to the whole Nuragic era up to the Iron Age, when they were substituted by pit graves, and are more frequent in the central sector of the island. Their plan was in the shape of the head of a bull.

Large stone sculptures known as betili (a kind of slender menhir, sometimes featuring crude depiction of male sexual organs, or of female breasts) were erected near the entrance. Sometimes the tombs were built with an opus isodomum technique, where finely shaped stones were used, such as in the giant tombs of Madau or at Iloi.

Art

Bronze statuettes

Most of them had been discovered in various sites of Sardinia; however, a sizeable minority had also been found in Etruscan sites, particularly tombs, of central Italy (Vulci, Vetulonia, Populonia, Magione) and Campania (Pontecagnano) and further south in the greek colony of Crotone.

Giants of Mont'e Prama

They depict warriors, archers, wrestlers, models of nuraghe and boxers with shield and armed glove.

Depending on the different hypotheses, the dating of the Kolossoi – the name that archaeologist Giovanni Lilliu gave to the statues – varies between the 11th and the 8th century BC. If this is further confirmed by archaeologists, like the C-14 analysis already did, they would be the most ancient anthropomorphic sculptures of the Mediterranean area, after the Egyptian statues, preceding the kouroi of ancient Greece.

They feature disc-shaped eyes and eastern-like garments. The statues probably depicted mythological heroes, guarding a sepulchre; according to another theory, they could be a sort of Pantheon of the typical Nuragic divinities.

Their finding proved that the Nuragic civilization had maintained its peculiarities, and introduced new ones across the centuries, well into the Phoenician colonization of part of Sardinia.

Ceramics

In the ceramics, the skill and taste of the Sardinian artisans are manifested mainly in decorating the surfaces of vessels, certainly used for ritual purposes in the course of complex ceremonies, perhaps in some cases even to be crushed at the end of the rite, as the jugs found in the bottom of the sacred wells.

Ceramics also display geometric patterns on lamps, pear-shaped vessels (exclusive of Sardinia) and the askos. Imported (e.g. Mycenaeans) and local forms were found in several sites all over the island. Also found in the Italian peninsula, Sicily, in Spain and in Crete everything points to Sardinia being very well integrated in the ancient trade of the Mediterranean Sea.

Language

The language (or languages) spoken in Sardinia during the Bronze Age is (are) unknown since there are no written records from the period, although recent research suggests that around the 8th century BC, in the Iron Age, the Nuragic populations may have adopted an alphabet of the  "red" (western) type, similar to that used in Euboea.

According to Eduardo Blasco Ferrer, the Paleo-Sardinian language was akin to Proto-Basque and ancient Iberian with faint Indo-European traces, but others believe it was related to Etruscan. Giovanni Ugas theorize that there were actually various linguistic areas (two or more) in Nuragic Sardinia, possibly Pre-Indo-Europeans and Indo-Europeans.

Several scholars, including Johannes Hubschmid, Max Leopold Wagner and Emidio De Felice, distinguished different pre-Roman linguistic substrates in Sardinia. The oldest, pan-Mediterranean, widespread in the Iberian Peninsula, France, Italy, Sardinia and North Africa, a second Hispano-Caucasian substrate, which would explain the similarities between Basque and Paleo-Sardinian, and, finally, a Ligurian substrate.

Economy
The Nuragic economy, at least at the origins, was mostly based on agriculture (new studies suggest that they were the first to practice viticulture in the western Mediterranean) and animal husbandry, as well as on fishing. Alcoholic beverages like wine and beer were also produced, the cultivation of melons, probably imported from the Eastern Mediterranean, proves the practice of horticulture. As in modern Sardinia, 60% of the soil was suitable only for breeding cattle and sheep. Probably, as in other human communities that have the cattle as traditional economic base, the property of this established social hierarchies. The existence of roads for wagons dating back to the 14th century BC gives the impression of a well organized society. The signs found in the metal ingots testify the existence of a number system used for accounting among the Nuragic people.

Navigation had an important role: historian Pierluigi Montalbano mentions the finding of nuragic anchors along the coast, some weighing . These allowed them to travel the whole Mediterranean, establishing commercial links with the Mycenaean civilization (attested by the common tholos tomb shape, and the adoration of bulls), Spain, Italy, Cyprus, Lebanon. Items such as Cyprus-type copper ingots have been found in Sardinia, while bronze and early Iron Age Nuragic ceramics have been found in the Aegean region, Cyprus, in Spain (Huelva, Tarragona, Málaga, Teruel and Cádiz) up to the Gibraltar strait, and in Etruscan centers of the Italian peninsula such as Vetulonia, Vulci and Populonia (known in the 9th to 6th centuries from Nuragic statues found in their tombs).

Sardinia was rich in metals such as lead and copper. Archaeological findings have proven the good quality of Nuragic metallurgy, including numerous bronze weapons. The so-called "golden age" of the Nuragic civilization (late 2nd millennium BC, early 1st millennium BCE) coincided perhaps with the apex of the mining of metals in the island.

The widespread use of bronze, an alloy which used tin, a metal which however was not present in Sardinia except perhaps in a single deposit, further proves the capability of the Nuragic people to trade in the resources they needed. A 2013 study of 71 ancient Swedish bronze objects dated to Nordic Bronze Age, revealed that most of the copper utilized at that time in Scandinavia came from Sardinia and the Iberian peninsula. Iron working is attested on the island since the 13th century BC.

Paleogenetics
A genetic study published in Nature Communications in February 2020 examined the remains of 17 individuals identified with Nuragic civilization. The samples of Y-DNA extracted belonged to haplogroup I2a1b1 (2 samples), R1b1b2a, G2a2b2b1a1, R1b1b (4 samples), J2b2a1 (3 samples) and G2a2b2b1a1a, while the samples of mtDNA extracted belonged to various types of haplogroup T, V, H, J, K and U. The study found strong evidence of genetic continuity between Nuragic civilization and earlier Neolithic inhabitants of Sardinia, who were genetically similar to Neolithic peoples of Iberia and southern France. They were determined to be of about 80% Early European Farmer (EEF) ancestry and 20% Western Hunter-Gatherer (WHG) ancestry. They were predicted to be largely descended from peoples of the Neolithic Cardial Ware culture, which spread throughout the western Mediterranean in Southern Europe c. 5500 BC. The Nuragic people were differentiated from many other Bronze Age peoples of Europe by the near absence of steppe-related ancestry.

A 2021 study by Villalba-Mouco et al. has identified a possible gene flow originating from the Italian peninsula starting from the Chalcolithic. In prehistoric Sardinia, the component associated with Iranian farmers (or Caucasus-related ancestry), present in Mainland Italy since the Neolithic (together with the EEF and WHG components), gradually increases from 0% in the Early Chalcolithic to about 5.8% in the Bronze Age. The absence of the component linked to the Magdalenians would instead exclude contributions from the Chalcolithic of the south of the Iberian peninsula.

According to a 2022 study by Manjusha Chintalapati et al., "In Sardinia, a majority of the Bronze Age samples do not have Steppe pastoralist-related ancestry. In a few individuals, we found evidence for steppe ancestry" which would arrive in ~2600 BC.

Physical appearance
The following results were obtained concerning eye pigmentation, as well as of Hair follicles and skin, from the study on ancient DNA of 44 individuals who had lived during the Nuragic period, coming from central and north-western Sardinia: the eye color is blue in 16% of the examined samples and dark in the remaining 84%. Hair color is 9% blond or dark blond and 91% dark brown or black. The skin color is intermediate for 50%, intermediate or dark for 16% and dark or very dark for the remaining 34%.

In popular culture

Cinema and television
Nuraghes S'Arena (2017) fantasy short film inspired by the Nuragic civilization featuring the Italian rapper Salmo.

Opera
I Shardana is an opera written by the Italian composer Ennio Porrino in 1959 set in Sardinia in the Nuragic period.

Music
Atmospheric black metal project Downfall of Nur describes the collapse of Nuragic civilization in his albums.

See also

 Nuraghe
History of Sardinia
List of Nuragic tribes
Paleo-Sardinian language
Nuragic bronze statuettes
Ancient peoples of Italy
Prehistoric Italy

Footnotes

References

Sources

Further reading

 
 
 

18th-century BC establishments
3rd-century BC disestablishments
Nuraghe
Archaeological cultures in Sardinia
History of Sardinia
Archaeological cultures of Southern Europe
Bronze Age cultures of Europe
Iron Age cultures of Europe
Pre-Indo-Europeans